Sergio Turiace (born 17 February 1963) is an Argentine fencer. He competed at the 1984 and 1988 Summer Olympics.

References

1963 births
Living people
Argentine male fencers
Argentine épée fencers
Argentine foil fencers
Olympic fencers of Argentina
Fencers at the 1984 Summer Olympics
Fencers at the 1988 Summer Olympics